Jordan Hitch is an American business executive, and currently serves as the managing director at Bain Capital Private Equity and Bain Capital, LLC.

He holds a B.S. in mechanical engineering from Lehigh University; and  an M.B.A., with distinction, from the University of Chicago Graduate School of Business.

He also serves on the board of Giraffe Holding Inc., Guitar Center Holdings Inc., Gymboree Corporation, and Burlington Coat Factory Investments Holdings Inc.

Early life and education
Hitch was born in the United States. He pursued engineering studies from Lehigh University. After earning a B.S. degree in Mechanical Engineering; he enrolled for an MBA program from University of Chicago Booth School of Business, which he completed with distinction.

Career
Hitch joined Nalco Chemical Company (presently Nalco Holding Company) as an area manager.

After Nalco, he made his entry into finance as a consultant with Bain & Company; focusing in the financial services, healthcare, and utility industries.

He later joined Bain Capital in 1997, and rose to the post of a managing director at Bain Capital Private Equity and Bain Capital, LLC.

Board
He serves as a director of Giraffe Holding Inc., and Guitar Center Holdings Inc. He has been a director of the Gymboree Corporation since November 2010, and Burlington Coat Factory Investments Holdings Inc. since April 13, 2006.

See also
Bain Capital

References

External links
Biography of Jordan Hitch

American businesspeople
Living people
University of Chicago Booth School of Business alumni
Lehigh University alumni
Place of birth missing (living people)
Year of birth missing (living people)